Mingajik (Mengajīk, Mengeh Jek, Mingajek, Mungajik) (Persian: منگجک)  is a village and the center of Mingajik District, Jowzjan Province, Afghanistan.

See also
 Jowzjan Province

Populated places in Jowzjan Province